South Metro Fire Rescue (SMFR) is a fire protection district which provides fire protection and emergency medical services for the municipalities of Bow Mar, Castle Pines, Centennial, Cherry Hills Village, Columbine Valley, Foxfield, Greenwood Village, Littleton, Lone Tree, Parker, portions of Aurora and Lakewood, and unincorporated portions of Arapahoe, Douglas, and Jefferson counties in Colorado.

South Metro Fire Rescue is an internationally accredited agency with the Commission on Fire Accreditation International (CFAI) and holds an Insurance Services Office (ISO) Public Protection Classification Class 1 rating. The district operates teams specializing in aircraft rescue and firefighting, bike medics, dive rescue, hazardous materials, incident management team, SWAT medic, technical rescue, urban search and rescue, and wildland firefighting.

The district is a product of decades of consolidation between area fire departments since the 1980s including Castle Pines Fire Department, Castlewood Fire Protection District, Cherry Hills Fire Protection District, Cunningham Fire Protection District, Littleton Fire Rescue, Louviers Fire Protection District, North Douglas County Fire Protection District, and Parker Fire Protection District.

History 
The origins of the South Metro Fire Rescue name comes from Castlewood Fire Protection District which had petitioned to change its name to South Metro Fire Rescue on December 31, 1998. Prior to South Metro Fire Rescue, Castlewood Fire Protection District began the trend of consolidating with neighboring departments with Castle Pines Fire Department and North Douglas County Fire Protection District in 1986, and Cherry Hills Fire Protection District in 1989.

In 1999, Robert Rinne assumed the fire chief position, and Louviers Fire Protection District agreed to merge with South Metro Fire Rescue effective January 1, 2000.

On January 19, 2006, South Metro Fire Rescue established the Metropolitan Area Communications Center (MetCom) to provide dispatching service for the district. In March 2006, the district achieved international accreditation from the CFAI, a distinction held by only three other agencies in the state at the time.

In April 2007, a report was provided to the district by Emergency Services Consulting Inc. noting a consistent lack of trust between personnel and the fire chief's office and suggested a change in leadership. An example cited by the report included questioning financial decisions made in purchasing four firetrucks whereas the apparatus committee suggested only purchasing one. By June, four members of South Metro Fire Rescue's leadership, including Chief Robert Rinne, had stepped down and Fire Marshall Mike Dell'Orfano assumed the position of acting chief. In October 2007, Parker Fire Protection District Chief Dan Qualman assumed the role of interim chief of South Metro Fire Rescue as a study began on consolidating operations with Parker Fire Protection District. The study was completed in March 2008 and found that a consolidation of departments would result in tax savings and better services. The two districts voted to consolidate on April 24, 2008 and began working together on May 1, 2008 as a single authority governed by the two boards of directors, the largest merger between two entities in Colorado at the time. On January 5, 2016, Parker Fire Protection District and South Metro Fire Rescue merged into a single district.

In January 2015, Chief Dan Qualman retired and Bob Baker assumed the position of fire chief for the district.

In November 2017, South Metro Fire Rescue and Cunningham Fire Protection District agreed to form a new joint fire authority to join the two districts together effective January 1, 2018. On January 1, 2019, South Metro's authority was expanded to include areas of the Highlands Ranch Metropolitan District, Littleton Fire Protection District, and City of Littleton that were previously covered by Littleton Fire Rescue, a department with history that dates back to 1890. As a result of the expansion, South Metro became the second largest fire district in Colorado. The authority was dissolved in May 2020 after redistricting of the board of directors and subsequent election allowed for voter representation from the newly added areas.

On January 1, 2018, South Metro received an ISO Class 1 rating after previously holding a Class 3 rating, and is notable for being the first agency in the United States to achieve a Class 1 rating in areas without a fire hydrant that would require water tenders to respond.

Stations and apparatus

Notable incidents 
 On May 7, 2019, the 2019 STEM School Highlands Ranch shooting occurred which resulted in one death and eight injuries. The initial response by South Metro Fire Rescue was upgraded to a large mass casualty incident based on information received and included mutual aid from neighboring agencies and three medical helicopters. The agency notes that over 150 support personnel, ambulances, and fire apparatus responded to the incident.

References

External links 
 Official website
 IAFF website

Fire departments in Colorado